Gentle Julia is a 1923 American silent romantic drama film based on the popular novel Gentle Julia by Booth Tarkington. Directed by Rowland V. Lee, the film starred Bessie Love. It was produced and distributed by Fox Film Corporation, and is considered a lost film.

Plot
Julia Atwater (Love) is the most popular girl in her Midwestern small town. She has many suitors, but she chooses an older man, Mr. Crum (Elliott). When he takes her back to his home in Chicago, she finds out he is married. She leaves him, returning to neighbor Noble Dill (Goodwin).

Cast

Production
Love was cast because she was "the last girl in Hollywood with long hair", although she was unaware of this and got an "Eton crop" haircut before filming commenced.

Reception
The film was well-received. Love's performance drew mixed reviews, with some giving her praise, and others deeming her as miscast. Arthur's performance as the young niece drew rave reviews.

See also
 1937 Fox vault fire

References

External links

 
 
 

1923 lost films
1923 romantic drama films
1923 films
American black-and-white films
American romantic drama films
American silent feature films
Films based on American novels
Films based on works by Booth Tarkington
Films directed by Rowland V. Lee
Fox Film films
Lost American films
Lost romantic drama films
1920s American films
Silent romantic drama films
Silent American drama films
1920s English-language films